The 1922 Bridgman Convention was a secret conclave of the underground Communist Party of America (CPA) held in August 1922 near the small town of Bridgman, Michigan, about  outside of the city of Chicago on the banks of Lake Michigan. The convention, called by the CPA as its annual gathering for the election of officers and making of internal decisions, was attended by a delegate who was secretly an employee of the Bureau of Investigation, who informed his superiors of the date and general location of the gathering. The convention was raided by local and federal law enforcement authorities on August 22, 1922, and a number of participants and a large quantity of documents seized in an operation which garnered national headlines. Two 1923 test trials of the Michigan criminal syndicalism law resulted from the arrests, with trade union leader William Z. Foster freed by a "hung jury," while Communist Party leader C. E. Ruthenberg was convicted. Ruthenberg ultimately died of peritonitis in 1927, just after his appeals were exhausted and just before sentence was enforced. No additional trials associated with the 1922 Bridgman raid were conducted.

History

The 1921 Central Caucus split

In the fall of 1921, a section of the Communist Party of America identifying themselves as a "Central Caucus," headed by Executive Secretary Charles Dirba and including Central Executive Committee members John J. Ballam and George Ashkenuzi, split from the CPA to form their own parallel organization. At issue was the decision of the CEC majority to hurriedly establish a parallel Workers Party of America (WPA), the "above-ground" and "legal" nature of which was believed to risk exposing the organization's largely immigrant membership to easy arrest and deportation. The split came after a mere eight months of tenuous unity between Dirba and his associates with the members of the former Communist Labor Party (CLP).

Dirba's "Central Caucus" group formally organized themselves as a competing organization, also known as the "Communist Party of America," at a convention held early in January 1922. This gathering, attended by 38 delegates, purported to represent 5,000 party members, fully half of the American communist movement at the time, 80 percent of whom hailed from various language federations of the old CPA. The Central Caucus faction objected to the establishment of a public Workers Party of America (WPA) to which all underground party members were required to belong. In addition to security concerns over the WPA, the radical Central Caucus group objected to the WPA's emphasis upon elections, considering this a turn away from the strategy of forcible overthrow of the bourgeoisie through revolution and the establishment of the dictatorship of the proletariat in accord with the Soviet model.

This new split of the American communist movement was vexing to the Communist International, which insisted upon one unified communist party in each country and which had struggled to unite its American factions ever since the formation of parallel organizations in September 1919. Although the Central Caucus actively campaigned with the Comintern on behalf of its position, going so far as to dispatch John Ballam to Moscow, the Comintern ruled against those participating in the new split and ordered them back into the "regular" CPA. The Comintern ultimatum declared that "All members that do not comply with the [unity] instructions within two months from the time they sent out by the CEC of the CP of A stand outside of the CP of A and therefore also out of the Comintern."

A convention was called for August 1922 to formally reintegrate the Central Caucus faction dissidents into the "regular" CPA and well as to decide upon various programmatic initiatives, such as the proposed dissolution of the underground organization in favor of the much more successful WPA. The dates of August 17–23, 1922, were set for the gathering, which was to be held at the Wolfskeel resort at Bridgman, Michigan, site of a 1920 convention of the United Communist Party of America which had gone off in secret without complications.

Unity Convention at Bridgman

The raid

Legal aftermath

Footnotes

Further reading
 Theodore Draper, The Roots of American Communism. New York: Viking Press, 1957.
 Labor Defense Committee, Help Repel This Attack Upon Labor! Chicago: Labor Defense Committee, n.d. [Nov. 1922].
 James Oneal, American Communism: A Critical Analysis of its Origins, Development and Programs. New York: Rand Book Store, 1927.
 Jacob Spolansky, The Communist Trail in America. New York: Macmillan, 1951.
 R.M. Whitney, Reds in America; the present status of the revolutionary movement in the U. S. based on documents seized by the authorities in the raid upon the convention of the Communist party at Bridgman, Mich., Aug. 22, 1922, together with descriptions of numerous connections and associations of the Communists among the Radicals, Progressives, and Pinks. New York: The Beckwith Press, 1924.

See also
 National conventions of the Communist Party USA
 Communist Party USA

External links
 "Agenda for the Second Convention of the unified Communist Party of America." Corvallis, OR: 1000 Flowers Publishing, 2006.
 "Decisions of the Second Annual Convention of the Communist Party of America," The Communist (New York: unified CPA), vol. 1, no. 10 (August–September 1922), pp. 3–5.
 "Delegates to the Second National Convention of the (unified) Communist Party of America," Early American Marxism website, marxisthistory.org/ Retrieved September 10, 2010.

Bridgman Convention, 1922
Federal Bureau of Investigation
1922 in Michigan
1922 conferences
National conventions of the Communist Party USA
Bridgman
Berrien County, Michigan